Superfecundation is the fertilization of two or more ova from the same cycle by sperm from separate acts of sexual intercourse, which can lead to twin babies from two separate biological fathers. The term superfecundation is derived from fecund, meaning the ability to produce offspring. Homopaternal superfecundation is fertilization of two separate ova from the same father, leading to fraternal twins, while heteropaternal superfecundation is a form of atypical twinning where, genetically, the twins are half siblings – sharing the same mother, but with different fathers.

Conception
Sperm cells can live inside a female's body for up to five days, and once ovulation occurs, the egg remains viable for 12–48 hours before it begins to disintegrate. Superfecundation most commonly happens within hours or days of the first instance of fertilization with ova released during the same cycle.

Ovulation is normally suspended during pregnancy to prevent further ova becoming fertilized and to help increase the chances of a full-term pregnancy. However, if an ovum is atypically released after the female was already impregnated when previously ovulating, a chance of a second pregnancy occurs, albeit at a different stage of development. This is known as superfetation.

Heteropaternal superfecundation
Heteropaternal superfecundation is common in animals such as cats and dogs. Stray dogs can produce litters in which every puppy has a different sire. Though rare in humans, cases have been documented. In one study on humans, the frequency was 2.4% among dizygotic twins whose parents had been involved in paternity suits.

Cases in Greek mythology
Greek mythology holds many cases of superfecundation:
 Leda lies with both her husband Tyndareus and with the god Zeus, the latter in the guise of a swan. Nine months later, she bears two daughters: Clytemnestra by Tyndareus and Helen by Zeus. This happens again; this time Leda bears two sons: Castor by Tyndareus and Pollux by Zeus.
 Alcmene lies with Zeus, who is disguised as her husband Amphitryon; Alcmene later lies with the real Amphitryon and gives birth to two sons: Iphicles by Amphitryon and Heracles by Zeus.
 Chione lies with both Apollo and Hermes on the same night, and falls pregnant. She bears two sons; Autolycus for Hermes and Philammon for Apollo.

Selected cases involving superfecundation
In 1982, twins who were born with two different skin colors were discovered to be conceived as a result of heteropaternal superfecundation.

In 1995, a young woman gave birth to diamniotic monochorionic twins, who were originally assumed to be monozygotic twins until a paternity suit led to a DNA test. This led to the discovery that the twins had different fathers.

In 2001, a case of spontaneous monopaternal superfecundation was reported after a woman undergoing IVF treatments gave birth to quintuplets after only two embryos were implanted. Genetic testing supported that the twinning was not a result of the embryos splitting, and that all five boys shared the same father.

In 2015, a judge in New Jersey ruled that a man should only pay child support for one of two twins, as he was only the biological father to one of the children.

In 2016, an IVF-implanted surrogate mother gave birth to two children: one genetically unrelated child from an implanted embryo, and a biological child from her own egg and her husband's sperm.

In 2019, a Chinese woman was reported to have two babies from different fathers, one of whom was her husband and the other was a man having a secret affair with her during the same time.

In 2022, a 19-year-old Brazilian from Mineiros gave birth to a twin from two different fathers with whom she had sex on the same day.

See also
 Chimera (genetics) 
 Mixed twins
 Polyandry in nature
 Polyspermy
 Twins

References

Further reading
 
 

Fertility
Multiple births
Reproduction